State Route 1 (SR 1), known as the Memphis to Bristol Highway, is a  mostly-unsigned state highway in the U.S. state of Tennessee. It stretches all the way from the Arkansas state line at Memphis in the southwest corner of the state to Bristol in the northeast part. Most of the route travels concurrently with U.S. Route 70 (US 70) and US 11W. It is the longest highway of any kind in the state of Tennessee. The route is signed as both in the state of Tennessee, a Primary and Secondary Highway (at different times throughout its designation)

In 2015, the Tennessee Department of Transportation erected signs along SR 1 showing motorists they are traveling on the Memphis to Bristol Highway, Tennessee's first state road. TDOT installed the signs at every county line while it celebrated its 100th anniversary.

Route description

Memphis Area
SR 1 begins as a primary route on Interstate 55 (I-55) in the middle of the Memphis & Arkansas Bridge at the Arkansas–Tennessee state line. US 61, US 64, US 70, and US 79 come off the bridge alongside SR 1; US 61 soon turns south with SR 14. The other three U.S. Highways split east onto SR 3, and US 51 joins, only to split with SR 4 where SR 1 turns east alone onto North Parkway. However, US 64/US 70/US 79 soon rejoin SR 1 at SR 57. These 4 routes continue as Summer Avenue until exiting Memphis. The portions where SR 1 runs by itself are signed.

Between Memphis and Nashville
SR 1 is a Primary Route until it runs around Brownsville. After the junction of SR 76,  SR 1 becomes a secondary route for a short time until it crosses TN-SR 186.

After leaving Memphis, SR 1 runs along the following routes:
 US 64, Memphis to SR 15 in Bartlett
 US 79, Memphis to SR 76 in Brownsville
 US 70, Memphis to SR 22 Bypass in Huntingdon
 US 70 Business through Huntingdon
 US 70/SR 364 in Huntingdon to SR 24 west of Belle Meade

Nashville
SR 1 enters Nashville from the west along US 70S through the community of Bellevue. Between Old Hickory Pike and White Bridge Road east of Belle Meade, the highway is known as Harding Pike. Between here and Downtown Nashville, SR 1 is known as West End Avenue. In downtown, SR 1 is known as Broadway. As SR 1 approaches 8th Avenue South/Rosa Parks, it turns right and southeast, joining US 41 and becoming known as Lafayette Street (briefly) and then Murfreesboro Road.

Between Nashville and Knoxville

Tennessee State Route 1 is a Primary Route until its intersection with US 70N/ TN-SR 24. It continues to be a secondary route until its intersection with US 11W. East of Nashville, SR 1 runs along the following routes:
 US 70S through Belle Meade and Nashville to SR 111 in Sparta
 US 41 from Downtown Nashville to Murfreesboro
 Separate through Sparta – the only signed portion
 US 70/SR 26 in Sparta to SR 168 in Knoxville

Knoxville
SR 1 enters Knox County along with US 70 and US 11 (which joins SR 1 a few feet from the county line). From here to near the downtown area, the road is locally known as Kingston Pike and near the University of Tennessee campus it is known as Cumberland Avenue. It turns north onto Henley Street becoming Broadway Street, east onto Magnolia Avenue, north onto Hall of Fame Drive, and back onto Magnolia Avenue. In East Knoxville, SR 1 splits from US 70 and continues northeast with US 11W as Rutledge Pike.

Between Knoxville and Bristol
Between Knoxville and Bristol, SR 1 runs along US 11W.

Bristol

In Bristol, SR 1 leaves US 11W right at the state line, and heads east on its own (as a primary route) along State Street. It turns south at US 11E/US 19, ending two blocks later at Broad Street (SR 34).

State designations
State Route 1 runs as a primary or secondary highway as follows:
Primary, Memphis to SR 76 in Brownsville
Secondary, SR 76 to SR 186 (US 45 Bypass) in Jackson
Primary, SR 186 to SR 22 Bypass in Huntingdon
Secondary, SR 22 Bypass to SR 364 in Huntingdon
Primary, SR 364 to I-40 west of Belle Meade
Secondary, I-40 to SR 100 in Belle Meade
Primary, SR 100 to I-440 in Nashville
Secondary, I-440 to I-24 in Nashville
Primary, I-24 to SR 24 in Crossville
Secondary, SR 24 to SR 29 south of Rockwood
Primary, SR 29 to SR 61 in Rockwood
Secondary, SR 61 to I-40 in Knoxville
Primary, I-40 to Bristol

 Interestingly, although State Route 1 is signed a Primary highway in Sparta, the TDOT Traffic Map for White County actually identifies this stretch as a Secondary Highway. (Between the eastern end of the TN-111 and US 70S concurrency to the eastern terminus of TN-26 at US 70 in Sparta). There are zero secondary designation reassurance shields signs along the entire State Route 1 corridor.

List of signed segments
US 61, US 64, US 70 and US 79 to US 51, US 64, US 70 and US 79 in Memphis
SR 14 and US 51 to US 64, US 70, US 79 and SR 57 in Memphis
US 70S and SR 111 to US 70 and SR 26 in Sparta
Along State Street in Bristol from US 11W to US 421

Major intersections

See also

 List of state routes in Tennessee
 List of highways numbered 1

References

 Tennessee Department of Transportation (24 January 2003). "State Highway and Interstate List 2003".
 Tennessee Department of Transportation official 2020 Map

External links
 

 
U.S. Route 11
U.S. Route 70
001
Bartlett, Tennessee
Transportation in Shelby County, Tennessee
Transportation in Fayette County, Tennessee
Transportation in Tipton County, Tennessee
Transportation in Haywood County, Tennessee
Transportation in Madison County, Tennessee
Transportation in Carroll County, Tennessee
Transportation in Benton County, Tennessee
Transportation in Humphreys County, Tennessee
Transportation in Dickson County, Tennessee
Transportation in Cheatham County, Tennessee
Transportation in Davidson County, Tennessee
Transportation in Rutherford County, Tennessee
Transportation in Cannon County, Tennessee
Transportation in Warren County, Tennessee
Transportation in Van Buren County, Tennessee
Transportation in White County, Tennessee
Transportation in Cumberland County, Tennessee
Transportation in Roane County, Tennessee
Transportation in Loudon County, Tennessee
Transportation in Knox County, Tennessee
Transportation in Grainger County, Tennessee
Transportation in Hawkins County, Tennessee
Transportation in Sullivan County, Tennessee
Transportation in Memphis, Tennessee
Jackson, Tennessee
Jackson metropolitan area, Tennessee
Transportation in Nashville, Tennessee
Murfreesboro, Tennessee
Transportation in Knoxville, Tennessee
Kingsport, Tennessee
Bristol, Tennessee